The Celaenorrhinini are a tribe of spread-winged skippers in the skipper butterfly subfamily Tagiadinae. 

These skippers are mainly found in tropical Africa. A few are found in Asia, and some species presently placed in the (paraphyletic) type genus Celaenorrhinus are found in the Neotropics.

Genera
The following genera – listed in the presumed phylogenetic sequence – are placed in the Celaenorrhinini:
 Alenia
 Aurivittia
 Apallaga
 Celaenorrhinus – sprites, "flats" (paraphyletic)
 Kobelana
 Eretis – "elves"
 Sarangesa – "elfins" (formerly often in Tagiadini)
 Pseudocoladenia (formerly often in Tagiadini)

Footnotes

References

  (2009): Tree of Life Web Project – Celaenorrhini. Version of 2009-JUN-14. Retrieved 2009-DEC-24.

 
Butterfly tribes